John Busteed Lee (born 1951) is a Canadian author and poet who is Poet Laureate of Brantford, Ontario. He has received more than 60 prestigious international awards for poetry.

Biography

Early life 
Born in Highgate, Ontario, Lee was raised on a farm near the village of Highgate. He went to Ridgetown District High School, where he wrote some of his earliest poems and has been named to the RDHS Hall of Excellence along with other distinguished alumni. He attended the University of Western Ontario where he received an Honours B.A. in English, and a BEd and M.A.T. in English. In 2010 he was received the UWO Alumni Award of Merit for Professional Achievement in recognition for his career as a poet/author/editor/performer/mentor.

Career 
Lee is the author of thirty-seven published books and ten published chapbooks and he is the editor of nearly ten published anthologies. A popular performer of children's poems and songs, he has been a writer-in-residence at the University of Windsor, Kitchener Public Library, and Hillfield Strathallen private school. Lee has also been a visiting professor at University of Western Ontario, University of Windsor, Canador College, and a guest speaker at the University of the Witwatersrand in South Africa, and many universities throughout Canada and the United States. In 2005 John B. Lee was named Poet Laureate of the City of Brantford in perpetuity. He was named Member of the President's Circle of McMaster University and his personal collection of Canadian Poetry was donated to the City Library where it is available for circulation under the title "The Poet Laureate Collection".

Lee is the recipient of the following awards:
 Twice Winner of The People's Poetry Award;
 Twice recipient of the Canadian Literary Award (CBC Radio);
 Twice Winner of the Eric Hill Award of Excellence in Poetry (2004 and 2005); and
 Recipient of over 70 prestigious international awards for poetry.
 Appointed Poet Laureate of the City of Brantford in perpetuity in 2005
 Appointed Poet Laureate of Norfolk County, 2010–2014

He is also an honorary life member of the following associations:
 Canadian Poetry Association;
  The Ontario Poetry Society.

Publications
 Poems Only A Dog Could Love, Applegarth Follies, 1976
 Love Among the Tombstones, Dogwood Press, 1980
 Fossils of the Twentieth Century, Vesta Publications, 1983
 Hired Hands, Brick Books, 1986 (Runner-up for the People's Poetry Award)
 Small Worlds, Vesta Publications, 1986
 Rediscovered Sheep, Brick Books, 1989
 The Bad Philosophy of Good Cows, Black Moss Press, 1989
 The Pig Dance Dreams, Black Moss Press, 1991 (Winner of the People's Poetry Award)
 The Hockey Player Sonnets, Penumbra Press, 1991
 When Shaving Seems Like Suicide, Goose Lane Editions, 1991
 Variations on Herb, Brick Books, 1993 (winner of the People's Poetry Award)
 The Art of Walking Backwards, Black Moss Press, 1993
 All the Cats Are Gone, Penumbra Press, 1993
 These Are the Days of Dogs and Horses, Black Moss Press, 1994
 The Beatles Landed Laughing in New York, Black Moss Press, 1995
 Tongues of the Children, Black Moss Press, 1996 (winner of the Tilden Award for poetry, 1995)
 Never Hand Me Anything if I Am Walking or Standing, Black Moss Press, 1997
 Soldier's Heart, Black Moss Press, 1998
 Stella's Journey, Black Moss Press, 1999
 Don't Be So Persnickety: The Runaway Sneezing Poems, Songs and Riddles, of John B. Lee, Black Moss Press, 2000
 The Half-Way Tree: Poems Selected and New, Black Moss Press, 2001
 In the Terrible Weather of Guns, Mansfield Press, 2002
 Totally Unused Heart, Black Moss Press, 2003
 Poems for the Pornographer's Daughter, Black Moss Press, 2005
 Godspeed, Black Moss Press, 2006
 But Where Were the Horses of Evening, Serengeti Press, 2007
 The Place That We Keep After Leaving, Black Moss Press, 2008
 "Island on the Wind-Breathed Edge of the Sea", Hidden Brook Press, 2009
 "Being Human" Sunbun Press, 2010
 "Dressed in Dead Uncles", Black Moss Press, 2010
 "Sweet Cuba: Cuban poetry in Spanish and English translation" Translations by John B. Lee and Manuel de Leon, Hidden Brook Press, 2010
 "In the Muddy Shoes of Morning," Hidden Brook Press, 2010
"Let Us Be Silent Here," Sanbun Publishing, 2012
You Can Always Eat the Dogs: The Hockeyness of Ordinary Men, Black Moss Press, 2012
"In This We Hear the Light," Hidden Brook Press, 2014
"Burning My Father," Black Moss Press, 2014

Chapbooks Broadsides and flyers
 Broken Glass, League of Canadian Poets, 1983 (poetry flyer)
 To Kill a White Dog, Brick Books, 1982 (chapbook)
 Broadside  HMS Press (Toronto)
 The Day Jane Fonda Came to Guelph, Plowman Press, 1989 (chapbook)
 In a Language with No Word for Horses, Above/Ground Press, 1997
 The Echo of Your Words Has Reached Me, Mekler and Deahl, 1998 (chapbook)
 An Almost Silent Drumming: The South Africa Poems, Cranberry Tree Press, 2001
 Though Their Joined Hearts Drummed Like Larks, Passion Among the Cacti Press, 2004
 Thirty-Three Thousand Shades of Green, Leaf Press, fall 2004
 The Bright Red Apples of the Dead, Pooka Press, 2004
 "One Leaf in the Breath of the World", The Ontario Poetry Society, 2009
 "Let Light Try All the Doors," Rubicon Press, 2009

Non-Fiction
 What's In a Name?, Dogwood Press, 1994, 1998 (essay in chapbook form)
 Head Heart Hands Health: A History of 4-H in Ontario, Comri Productions, 1995 (history)
 Building Bicycles in the Dark: A Practical Guide to Writing, Black Moss Press, 2001
 The Farm on the Hill He Calls Home: A Memoir, Black Moss Press, 2004
 Left Hand Horses: a meditation on Influence and the imagination, Black Moss Press, 2007
 King Joe: A Matter of Treason—The Life and Times of Joseph Willcocks, Heronwood Productions, 2010

Editor
 "That Sign of Perfection: From Bandy Legs to Beer Legs — Poems and Stories on the Game of Hockey", Black Moss Press, 1995 (edited by John B. Lee)
 "Losers First: Poems and Stories on Game and Sport", Black Moss Press, 1999 (edited by John B. Lee)
 "I Want to Be the Poet of Your Kneecaps: Poems of Quirky Romance", Black Moss Press, 1999 (edited by John B. Lee)
 "Henry's Creature: Poems and Stories on the Automobile", Black Moss Press, 2000 (edited by Roger Bell and John B. Lee)
 "Following the Plough: Recovering the Rural — Poems and Stories on the Land", Black Moss Press, 2000 (edited by John B. Lee)
 "Smaller Than God: Words of Spiritual Longing", Black Moss Press, 2001 (edited by Brother Paul Quenon and John B. Lee)
 "Body Language: A Head-to-Toe Anthology", Black Moss Press, 2003
Bonjour Burgundy: writing from La Roche D'Hys, Mosaic Press, 2007
Under the Weight of Heaven: writing from Gethsemani, Black Moss Press, 2008
HI
Tough Times:when the money doesn't love us, Black Moss Press, 2010
"Sweet Cuba: The Building of a poetic tradition 1608–1958," co-translated in Spanish with English translations by John B. Lee and Manuel Leon, Hidden Brook Press, 2011
"An Unfinished War: poetry and prose on the War of 1812," Black Moss Press, 2012
"Window Fishing: the Night We Caught Beatlemania," Hidden Brook Press, 2014

References

John B. Lee at poets.ca

20th-century Canadian poets
Canadian male poets
1951 births
Living people
People from Chatham-Kent
University of Western Ontario alumni
Chapbook writers
20th-century Canadian male writers
Poets Laureate of places in Canada